Major General Edwin Horace Alexander Beckett CB, MBE (16 May 1937 – 15 November 2018) was a British Army officer who became Head of the British Defence Staff in Washington, D.C.

Military career
Educated at the Henry Fanshawe School and the Royal Military Academy Sandhurst, Beckett was commissioned into the West Yorkshire Regiment in 1957. As a junior officer he saw active service during the Aden Emergency. He became commanding officer of 1st Battalion Prince of Wales's Own Regiment of Yorkshire in 1976, a member of the directing staff at the Staff College, Camberley in 1979 and Commander of 1st Infantry Brigade in 1982. He went on to be Chief of Staff at Headquarters British Army of the Rhine in 1985 and Head of the British Defence Staff and Defence Attaché in Washington, D.C. in 1988 before retiring in 1991.

After retiring from the Army, Beckett was Chairman of the British Brands Group.

He died on 15 November 2018 at the age of 81.

References

1937 births
Companions of the Order of the Bath
2018 deaths
British Army major generals
West Yorkshire Regiment officers
Members of the Order of the British Empire
Place of birth missing
British military attachés
Academics of the Staff College, Camberley